Farmanabad may refer to:

Farmanabad, Lorestan
Farmanabad, Razavi Khorasan